Loser is a children’s novel by Jerry Spinelli, first published in 2002 by Joanna Cotler, an imprint of Harper Collins Books. It portrays the growth of Zinkoff, who is considered "stupid" by his classmates due to his clumsiness, poor performance in school and athletics, and sometimes, clueless enthusiasm. 

This book is unique among Spinelli's works as it is written entirely in the present tense.

Accolades 
It was nominated for the 2004-05 Mark Twain Award.

References

2002 American novels
American young adult novels
Novels by Jerry Spinelli